Ea Nuôl is a commune (xã) and village in the Buôn Đôn District of Đắk Lắk Province, Vietnam. The commune covers an area of 67.73 square kilometres and in 1999 had a population of 8,591 people.

References

Communes of Đắk Lắk province
Populated places in Đắk Lắk province